William Flynt Nichols (October 16, 1918 – December 13, 1988) was a Democratic member of United States House of Representatives from Alabama, having served from 1967 until his death from a heart attack in Washington, D.C. in 1988.

Life
Nichols was born on October 16, 1918. On January 30, 1942, Nichols married Maude Carolyn Funderburk. He was a Methodist, having served on the Board of Stewards of Sylacauga's First Methodist Church.

Nichols died of a heart attack on December 13, 1988.

Education
Nichols received a bachelor's degree in Agriculture in 1939 from the Alabama Polytechnic Institute (now Auburn University) and a master's degree in Agronomy from the same institution in 1941.

Military service
Nichols enlisted in the United States Army in 1942 and served five years in the European Theatre. He was wounded at the Battle of Hürtgen Forest, losing a leg in a land mine explosion. He was awarded the Bronze Star Medal and the Purple Heart, and retired with the rank of Captain in 1947. Following his retirement, he lived in Sylacauga, Alabama, where he is also buried.

Business career
After military service, Nichols was employed by the Parker Fertilizer Company, and would later become president of the associated Parker Gin Company.

Politics

Service in the Alabama Legislature
Prior to his congressional service, he served over an eight-year period in both houses of the Alabama Legislature, having been elected to the Alabama House of Representatives in 1958 and the Alabama Senate in 1962.

Congressional service
A strong supporter of Alabama's George Wallace, Nichols unseated freshman Republican U.S. Representative Arthur Glenn Andrews in the 1966 general election, while Wallace's wife, Lurleen Burns Wallace was handily winning the governorship.

Nichols defeated Andrews again in 1970. He was elected to eleven terms.

In 1986, with retiring Republican U.S. Senator Barry Goldwater of Arizona, Nichols co-authored the Goldwater–Nichols Act, the far-reaching reorganization of the United States Department of Defense command structure. Glenn Andrews initially won the Alabama House seat that Nichols held for nearly a generation while Andrews was running on the 1964 Goldwater–Miller presidential ticket.

See also

 List of United States Congress members who died in office (1950–1999)

References

External links
 
 Alabama Academy of Honor: William Flynt Nichols
 
 

1918 births
1988 deaths
American amputees
American politicians with disabilities
People from Monroe County, Mississippi
Auburn University alumni
United States Army personnel of World War II
United States Army officers
Democratic Party members of the Alabama House of Representatives
Democratic Party Alabama state senators
Democratic Party members of the United States House of Representatives from Alabama
20th-century American politicians